The following is a list of Australian radio station callsigns beginning with the number 7, indicating radio stations in the state of Tasmania.

Defunct Callsigns

 
Radio station callsigns, Tasmania
Radio station callsigns
Lists of radio stations in Australia